Christopher Charles Rokos (born 21 September 1970) is a British billionaire hedge fund manager. He is the founder of macro hedge fund Rokos Capital Management and a former founding partner of Brevan Howard Asset Management.

According to The Sunday Times Rich List in 2020, Rokos' net worth is estimated at £800 million. In 2021, the Sunday Times Rich List estimated his wealth at £1.25 bn.

Early life
Rokos was identified by his UK maintained (state) primary school as a pupil with academic potential, especially in maths and science. He was entered for a scholarship at leading public school, Eton College. Rokos attended Eton for five years before going on to study mathematics at Pembroke College, Oxford University, graduating in 1992 with a first class honours degree. He holds an MA from Oxford University and is a Foundation Fellow of Pembroke College.

Career
After leaving university, Rokos joined UBS in London. Within a year, he joined Goldman Sachs, working there for three years, first in derivative structuring, then swap market making and eventually proprietary trading. In January 1998, Rokos was recruited by Alan Howard to join Credit Suisse as a proprietary trader.

In early 2002, Alan Howard and Rokos both resigned, together with three other directors at Credit Suisse – Jean Philippe Blochet, James Vernon and Trifon Natsis. Together, they founded an asset management business which they named Brevan Howard, and which quickly became one of Europe's most successful hedge funds.

Rokos became widely known as the firm's "star trader" and one of the world's most influential government-bond traders, with positions so vast Wall Street trading desks reportedly sought to stay abreast of his views on the market, as they could move long-standing relationships between prices. Rokos generated $4 billion in profits whilst at Brevan Howard, trading securities tied to interest rates for the firm's flagship Master Fund, including $1.11 billion in 2007, equivalent to 27% of the fund's total profits that year, as well as $549 million in 2008 and $933 million in 2009. His best year for the Brevan Howard Master Fund came in 2011, when he made $1.27 billion for the fund, according to documents filed in his subsequent court case. The same documents also revealed that Rokos personally earned about $900 million during his 10 years at Brevan, a figure dwarfing previous estimates.

Rokos Capital Management 
In 2012, Rokos retired from Brevan Howard, setting up a family office in London's Mayfair to manage his own wealth. But in the summer of 2014, wishing to return to trading, he filed a suit in the Royal Court of Jersey against Brevan Howard contesting the five-year noncompete restrictions which would have prevented him from managing outside capital until at least 2018.

The high-profile case was settled out of court in January 2015, clearing the way for Rokos to start his own firm in one of the "most anticipated hedge-fund launches of recent years", according to The Wall Street Journal. With investors reportedly forbidden from discussing the launch, Reuters reported that much of the money initially invested in the fund would be provided by Rokos himself, with a primary focus on foreign exchange, fixed income and equity index products in developed markets and relatively liquid emerging markets.

Rokos Capital Management began trading in the Autumn of 2015, gaining approximately 20 per cent in its first calendar year (2016). According to the Financial Times, Rokos Capital Management was helped by bets on market moves around Donald Trump's election victory.

Rokos was one of a number of hedge fund managers who predicted the UK Referendum vote on EU membership incorrectly, The New York Times wrote that he had told associates that he expected the "remain" vote to win. Rokos Capital Management still made money, gaining more than 2.5 percent in a single day immediately after the vote. 

The performance of Rokos Capital Management in 2016 was followed by two years of indifference, reflecting a difficult trading period for macro hedge funds. In 2017–2018, Rokos Capital Management's profits fell by 85% to £22.9 million. Rokos continued to complete the build-out of the firm in readiness for the return of more favourable market conditions.

Rokos Capital is one of the biggest and top performing hedge funds in London.

Political donations
Rokos was one of a number of hedge fund managers who made donations to Britain's Conservative Party in the run-up to the 2015 general election, contributing £1.9 million in total. Since 2015, Rokos has been an occasional donor only to the Party.

Social contributions
Rokos says little about his charitable giving. It is known that he provides financial support to organisations seeking to guarantee basic human rights and needs, and to initiatives which promote equality of opportunity, especially in education.

He has given to Amnesty International and Water Aid, and supports Pro Bono Economics, a charitable organisation which helps other charities to measure performance, improve services and improve impact.

He is supporting a five-year fellowship, called the Chris Rokos Fellowship in Evolution and Cancer, at London's Institute of Cancer Research to explore how cancer occurs and why. The fellowship has been awarded to Dr Andrea Sottoriva who is applying Darwinian principles of natural selection in a quest to understand why cancer develops and why it is so difficult to treat.

Rokos supports the New Foundation Scholarships programme at Eton College. Mirroring his own educational experience, this initiative offers up to four scholarships for children from schools in the state sector. It is aimed at children from poorer backgrounds who have potential and who would not otherwise be able to gain access to the education which Eton offers.

Pembroke College, Oxford University named a quad after Rokos when he gave the lead gift to the campaign which went on to raise £17 million to fund the surrounding buildings complex. He also supports other educational initiatives linked to Pembroke College; notably the Rokos Award Research Scholarships and the Oxford-Rokos Graduate Scholarships. Pembroke undergraduates studying STEM subjects are eligible to apply for the Rokos Awards, which are intended to support students looking to enhance their studies and scientific knowledge through research internships.

The Oxford-Rokos Graduate Scholarship is 60% funded by Rokos, and 40% by Oxford University, and covers the entire cost of living and fees for the full duration of a student's course. It is offered to applicants who have "demonstrated excellent academic ability", who will "contribute to the University’s ground-breaking research", and who are "expected to go on to contribute to the world as leaders in their field".

Rokos also supports the Rokos Career Development Fellowship in Economics or Economic History at Pembroke College. It is awarded with preference to candidates whose research area matches those of the Fellow in Economics at Pembroke College, Dr Brian A’Hearn, including research on cities and regions, institutions, political economy, technology, labour markets, human capital, and living standards in Europe.

Rokos is known to have an interest in art, especially ‘Old Masters'. In 2010, the Financial Times reported that Rokos was understood to be the buyer of Domenichino's great baroque painting of "St John the Evangelist" (1620s). The painting sold at Christie's in December 2010 to a US buyer but its export was deferred. At that point a new buyer – believed to be Rokos – came forward to buy the painting and lend it to the National Gallery. Rokos was amongst major donors who in 2012 contributed to the National Gallery's successful Appeal to save Titians's Diana and Actaeon for the nation.

Personal life
Described by the Daily Telegraph as a highly secretive man, Rokos is rarely seen in his home town of Cleobury Mortimer in Shropshire, as he regularly flies in and out using his own helicopter. Little is known of his personal life. He has property in Wiltshire including the Tottenham Estate near Marlborough (former home of the Earl of Cardigan), the Little Bedwyn Estate, and the Stype estate near Hungerford.

References

1970 births
Living people
Alumni of Pembroke College, Oxford
British hedge fund managers
Conservative Party (UK) people
Credit Suisse people
English investors
Goldman Sachs people
People educated at Eton College
Businesspeople from London